Infinitum: Subject Unknown is a 2021 British science fiction film directed by Matthew Butler-Hart. It stars Tori Butler-Hart, Ian McKellen and Conleth Hill. The film was shot entirely on the iPhone during the UK’s first lockdown.

Plot
Jane is trapped in an experiment in a parallel universe and is forced to find a way to alter her reality before she is lost forever, with clues pointing to a Professor Aaron Östergaard and Dr. Charles Marland-White.

Cast
 Tori Butler-Hart as Jane
 Ian McKellen as Dr. Charles Marland-White
 Conleth Hill as Professor Aaron Östergaard
 Wendy Muir Hart as Wytness scientist
 Christopher Hart as Wytness scientist
 Matthew Butler-Hart as Case Watch Agent

Reception 
On Rotten Tomatoes, the film has an approval rating of 75% based on 8 reviews, with an average rating of 6.20/10.

References

External links

2021 films
2021 science fiction films
British science fiction films
2020s English-language films
2020s British films